The Burnside Plantation is a  plantation in Bethlehem, Pennsylvania and was listed on the National Register of Historic Places in 1990. It is also known as the James Burnside Plantation and Lerch Farm.

History 
James Burnside bought a  tract of land from John Stephen Benezet in 1748. Burnside sold  a group of Moravians in 1751. In 1758, Burnside's widow sold the remaining  to the Moravian Church. The Church leased the plantation to individual farmers from 1765 to 1845.

The plantation was sold to Charles A. Luckenbach, who sold it to William Lerch in 1853. It stayed in the Lerch family until 1928, when it sold and was divided between the Hafleighs and the Birks.

Lehigh County bought the plantation in 1986 and leased it into the private corporation Historic Bethlehem Museums & Sites "to restore, develop, and manage [it] as a living and natural history resource". It was listed on the National Register of Historic Places on May 2, 1990.

The museum is an affiliate within the Smithsonian Affiliations program.

Today the farmstead hosts a variety of events, volunteer projects, venue rentals, historic tours, and festivals. Visitors can tour the farmhouse and the barns and learn about the daily lives of the early people who lived here.

No people or animals presently live on the plantation but it was home to the Bethlehem Mounted Police Unit horses from 2009 through early 2017.

Gallery

See also 
 National Register of Historic Places listings in Lehigh County, Pennsylvania

References

External links
Historic Bethlehem Museums & Sites Official Burnside Plantation Page

Federal architecture in Pennsylvania
Bethlehem, Pennsylvania
Houses on the National Register of Historic Places in Pennsylvania
Museums in Northampton County, Pennsylvania
Historic house museums in Pennsylvania
Farm museums in Pennsylvania
Smithsonian Institution affiliates
Houses in Northampton County, Pennsylvania
National Register of Historic Places in Northampton County, Pennsylvania